Arrowroot is to an edible starch obtained from several tropical plants.

Arrowroot may also refer to:

Plants
 Maranta arundinacea, called arrowroot, the traditional source of the starch
 Queensland arrowroot, a cultivar of M. arundinacea belonging to the Canna Agriculture Group
 Cassava (Manihot esculenta), produces tapioca, also called Brazilian arrowroot
 Florida arrowroot,  a commercial starch derived from Zamia pumila, harvested from the wild in Florida
Achillea millefolium, commonly known as yarrow
Colocasia esculenta, sometimes called arrowroot in East Africa
Curcuma angustifolia, a plant with a starchy root cultivated in India
 Kudzu (Pueraria lobata), Japanese arrowroot
Thalia geniculata, a plant species widespread across tropical Africa and much of the Americas
Tacca leontopetaloides, known among other names as the Polynesian arrowroot

Other uses 
Arrowroot (novel) (Yoshino kuzu), a 1931 novel by Jun'ichirō Tanizaki
Arrowroot, son of Arrowshirt, a fictional character in a 1969 parody novel Bored of the Rings

See also 
Arrowhead, Sagittaria species that can be used as a root vegetable
Arrowweed, Pluchea sericea, which has edible roots